The 1264–65 papal election (12 October 1264 – 5 February 1265) was convened after the death of Pope Urban IV and ended by electing his successor Pope Clement IV. It met in Perugia, where Urban IV had taken refuge after being driven out of Orvieto.  He had never been in Rome as Pope, but spent his entire reign in exile. It was the second election in a row where a pope was elected in absentia; the phenomenon would be repeated in the Conclave of 1268–1271, and again in the Conclave of 1292–1294. In the last two cases, the person elected was not even a Cardinal.

According to Salimbene di Adam, the archbishop of Ravenna, Filippo da Pistoia, had hopes of being elected.

Cardinals

At the time of Pope Urban's death there were twenty-one cardinals.  At least two did not attend the Election, Cardinal Simon de Brion, Legate to King Philip III of France, and Cardinal Guido Grosso Fulcodi, Legate to King Henry III.  Cardinal Simon Paltineri, governor of Campania for Urban IV and later for Clement IV, might or might not have attended.

References

Bibliography

 Jean Roy, Nouvelle histoire des cardinaux françois  Tome quatrième (Paris: Poincot 1787). 
 Lorenzo Cardella, Memorie storiche de' cardinali della Santa Romana Chiesa Tomo primo, Parte secondo (Roma: Pagliarini 1792).
 Joseph Maubach, Die Kardinäle und ihre Politik um die Mitte des XIII. Jahrhunderts (Bonn: Carl Georgi, 1902).
 Joseph Heidemann, Papst Clemens IV. (Münster 1903). 
 Augustin Demski, Papst Nikolaus III, Eine Monographie (Münster 1903). 
 Richard Sternfeld, Der Kardinal Johann Gaetan Orsini (Papst Nikolaus III.) 1244-1277 (Berlin: E. Ebering 1905).
 E. Jordan, "Promotion de cardinaux sous Urbain IV," Revue d'histoire et de littérature religieuses 5 (1900) 322–334.
 K. Hampe, Urban IV. und Manfred (1261-1264) (Heidelberg, 1905), 
 Ferdinand Gregorovius, History of Rome in the Middle Ages Volume V. 2, second edition, revised (London: George Bell, 1906), Book X, Chapter 1, pp. 335–358. 
 Francis Roth, OESA, "Il Cardinale Riccardo Annibaldi, Primo Prottetore dell' Ordine Agostiniano," Augustiniana 2 (1952) 26–60.

Papal elections
13th-century elections
1264
1265
13th-century Catholicism
1264 in Europe
1265 in Europe